Frank Cignetti may refer to:

 Frank Cignetti Sr. (1937–2022), American football player and coach, head coach at West Virginia University (1976–1979) and Indiana University of Pennsylvania (1986–2005)
 Frank Cignetti Jr. (born 1965), American football player and coach, current quarterbacks coach for the New York Giants, son of the former